Yih-Ho Michael Pao is an American entrepreneur and hydro-engineer. He was an early pioneer in developing large-scale wind turbines. In 2000, Dr. Pao was elected a member of the National Academy of Engineering for his research, development, and commercialization of ultrahigh-pressure waterjet technology.

Pao graduated from Johns Hopkins University in 1962.

Between 1970 and 2000, he formed and led six commercial companies in the United States based upon new technologies. These efforts created, developed and commercialized four new technologies that produce industrial tools:
Waterjet technology
Horizontal directional drilling technology
Vertical axis wind turbine technology
Advanced wet-blasting technology

Pao lives in Houston, Texas.

Notes

Further reading
 Staff (March 2009) "China Needs More Innovations: Interview with Dr. Y. H. Michael Pao" iChina Magazine

Machine tool builders
American civil engineers
Living people
Johns Hopkins University alumni
Members of the United States National Academy of Engineering
People from Houston
Year of birth missing (living people)